The 1979 season in Swedish football, starting April 1979 and ending November 1979.

Honours

Official titles

Notes

References 
Online

 
Seasons in Swedish football